Frances J. de Lautour (born 30 July 1944), better known as Frances de la Tour, is an English actress. She is known for her role as Miss Ruth Jones in the television sitcom Rising Damp from 1974 until 1978. She is a Tony Award winner and three-time Olivier Award winner.

She performed as Mrs. Lintott in the play The History Boys in London and on Broadway, winning the 2006 Tony Award for Best Featured Actress in a Play. She reprised the role in the 2006 film. Her other film roles include Madame Olympe Maxime in Harry Potter and the Goblet of Fire (2005). Television roles include Emma Porlock in the Dennis Potter serial Cold Lazarus (1996), headmistress Margaret Baron in BBC sitcom Big School and Violet Crosby in the sitcom Vicious.

Early life and family
De la Tour was born on 30 July 1944 in Bovingdon, Hertfordshire, to Moyra (née Fessas) and Charles de la Tour (1909–1982). The name was also spelled De Lautour, and it was in this form that her birth was registered in Hemel Hempstead, Hertfordshire, in the third quarter of 1944. She has French, Greek, and Irish ancestry. She was educated at London's Lycée Français and the Drama Centre London.
 
She is the sister of actor and screenwriter Andy de la Tour, and was briefly married to playwright Tom Kempinski. She has a son and a daughter.

An episode of the BBC series Who Do You Think You Are?, first broadcast on 22 October 2015, revealed de la Tour to be a descendant of the aristocratic Delaval family.

Career

Theatre
After leaving drama school, she joined the Royal Shakespeare Company (RSC) in 1965. Over the next six years, she played many small roles with the RSC in a variety of plays, gradually building up to larger parts such as Hoyden in The Relapse and culminating in Peter Brook's acclaimed production of A Midsummer Night's Dream, in which she played Helena as a comic "tour de force".

In the 1970s, she worked steadily both on the stage and on television. Some of her notable appearances were Rosalind in As You Like It at the Playhouse, Oxford in 1975 and Isabella in The White Devil at the Old Vic in 1976. She enjoyed a collaboration with Stepney's Half Moon Theatre, appearing in the London première of Dario Fo's We Can't Pay? We Won't Pay (1978), Eleanor Marx's Landscape of Exile (1979), and in the title role of Hamlet (1980).

In 1980, she played Stephanie, the violinist with MS in Duet for One, a play written for her by Kempinski, for which she won the Olivier for Best Actress. She played Sonya in Uncle Vanya opposite Donald Sinden at the Theatre Royal, Haymarket in 1982. Her performance as Josie in Eugene O'Neill's A Moon for the Misbegotten won her another Olivier for Best Actress in 1983. She joined the Royal National Theatre for the title role in Saint Joan in 1984 and appeared there in Brighton Beach Memoirs in 1986. She again won the Olivier, this time for Best Supporting Actress for Martin Sherman's play about Isadora Duncan, When She Danced, with Vanessa Redgrave at the Globe Theatre in 1991 and played Leo in Les Parents terribles at the Royal National Theatre in 1994, earning another Olivier nomination.

In 1994, de la Tour co-starred with Maggie Smith in Edward Albee's Three Tall Women at the Wyndham's and with Alan Howard in Albee's The Play About the Baby at the Almeida in 1998. In 1999, she returned to the RSC to play Cleopatra opposite Alan Bates in Antony and Cleopatra, in which she did a nude walk across the stage. In 2004, she played Mrs. Lintott in Alan Bennett's The History Boys at the National and later on Broadway, winning both a Drama Desk Award and a Tony Award for Best Featured Actress in a Play. She would also later appear in the film version. In December 2005, she appeared in the London production of the highly acclaimed anti-Iraq War one-woman play Peace Mom by Dario Fo, based on the writings of Cindy Sheehan. In 2007, she appeared in a West End revival of the farce Boeing-Boeing. In 2009, she appeared in Alan Bennett's new play The Habit of Art at the National. In 2012, she returned to the National in her third Bennett premiere, People.

Film and television
Her many television appearances during the 1980s and 1990s include the 1980 miniseries Flickers opposite Bob Hoskins, the TV version of Duet for One, for which she received a BAFTA nomination, the series A Kind of Living (1988–89), Dennis Potter's Cold Lazarus (1996), and Tom Jones (1997). Of all her TV roles, however, she is best known for playing spinster Ruth Jones in the successful Yorkshire Television comedy Rising Damp, from 1974 to 1978. De la Tour told Richard Webber, who wrote a 2001 book about the series, that Ruth Jones "was an interesting character to play. We laughed a lot on set, but comedy is a serious business, and Leonard took it particularly seriously, and rightly so. Comedy, which is so much down to timing, is exhausting work. But it was a happy time." Upon reprising her Rising Damp role in the 1980 film version, she won Best Actress at the Evening Standard British Film Awards.

In the mid-1980s, de la Tour was considered, along with Joanna Lumley and Dawn French, as a replacement for Colin Baker on Doctor Who. The idea was scrapped and the job was given to Sylvester McCoy.

In 2003, de la Tour played a terminally ill gay woman in the film Love Actually with the actress Anne Reid, although her scenes were cut from the film's theatrical release and appear only on the DVD.

In 2005, she portrayed Olympe Maxime, headmistress of Beauxbatons Academy, in Harry Potter and the Goblet of Fire. In 2010, she reprised Maxime as a cameo in Harry Potter and the Deathly Hallows Part 1. Notable television roles during this time include Agatha Christie's Poirot: Death on the Nile (2004), Waking the Dead (2004), the black comedy Sensitive Skin (2005), with Joanna Lumley and Denis Lawson, Agatha Christie's Marple: The Moving Finger (2006) and New Tricks as a rather morbid Egyptologist, also in 2006.

She was nominated for the 2006 BAFTA Award for Actress in a Supporting Role for her work on the film version of The History Boys.

She later appeared in several well-received films, including Tim Burton's 2010 Alice in Wonderland as Aunt Imogene, a delusional aunt of Alice's, opposite Johnny Depp, Anne Hathaway, Helena Bonham Carter, and Mia Wasikowska and a supporting role in the film The Book of Eli, directed by the Hughes brothers. In 2012, she appeared in the film Hugo.

Until 2012, she was also a patron for the performing arts group Theatretrain.

From 2013 to 2016, de la Tour played the role of Violet Crosby in ITV sitcom Vicious with Ian McKellen and Derek Jacobi.

From 2013 to 2014, she portrayed headmistress Ms Baron in the BBC One sitcom Big School.

In April 2016, she joined the second series of Outlander as Mother Hildegarde.

In 2021, de la Tour appeared in an ITV production, initially released on BritBox - Professor T. - in which she played the mother of the titular character.

Personal life
Politically, de la Tour is a socialist and was a member of the Workers' Revolutionary Party in the 1970s.

Filmography

Awards and nominations

Stage

References

External links
 Frances de la Tour's website 
 
 

 But you're beautiful, Miss Jones:  Interview
 Biography at Official Rising Damp web site

1944 births
Living people
20th-century English actresses
21st-century English actresses
Actresses from Hertfordshire
Drama Desk Award winners
English film actresses
English people of French descent
English people of Greek descent
English people of Irish descent
English radio actresses
English Shakespearean actresses
English stage actresses
English television actresses
Laurence Olivier Award winners
People from Bovingdon
Royal Shakespeare Company members
Tony Award winners
Workers Revolutionary Party (UK) members